is a Japanese footballer who plays as a right winger for Israeli side Hapoel Acre of the Liga Leumit.

Career
He played at Kumiyama High School and Hannan University in Japan, before coming to Poland where, after playing half-season with Gwardia Koszalin, he joined Pogoń Szczecin and played three whole years with them. Next, he had a spell in Thailand where he played with Ratchaburi in 2016.

In summer 2018 he was back in Europe, this time by signing with Serbian SuperLiga side FK Zemun. In January 2019 Murayama signed a contract with Hapoel Petah Tikva F.C. of the Israeli second tier league.

Honours
Ratchaburi
Thai FA Cup: 2016

References

1989 births
Living people
Japanese footballers
Japanese expatriate footballers
Association football midfielders
Ekstraklasa players
Pogoń Szczecin players
Gwardia Koszalin players
Takuya Murayama
FK Zemun players
Hapoel Petah Tikva F.C. players
Hapoel Acre F.C. players
Takuya Murayama
Expatriate footballers in Poland
Expatriate footballers in Thailand
Japanese expatriate sportspeople in Thailand
Serbian SuperLiga players
Expatriate footballers in Serbia
Japanese expatriate sportspeople in Serbia
Expatriate footballers in Israel
Japanese expatriate sportspeople in Israel
Hannan University alumni
Sportspeople from Osaka